Shahpur, also known as Santokpura, is a village in Kheralu Taluka in Mahesana district of Gujarat, India. The village is located in the western part of India, near the northern border of Mahesana district.
 2011 census, Shahpur had a population of 456 in 95 households.

References

Villages in Mehsana district